Colin Frederick Walker (born 29 October 1962) is an English former athlete who specialised in the 3000 metres steeplechase.

Athletics career
Walker represented Great Britain at the 1992 Olympic Games, at the World Championships in 1991 and 1993, and won a bronze medal representing England at the 1990 Commonwealth Games in Auckland, New Zealand.

Born in Stockton-on-Tees, Walker won the AAAs Championship title four times (1989, 1991–93) and the UK Championship title twice (1987, 1992). His personal best in the event is 8:25.15, set when winning the AAAs Championships (incorporating the Olympic trial) in Birmingham in 1992.

International competitions

References

Living people
1962 births
Sportspeople from Stockton-on-Tees
British male steeplechase runners
English male steeplechase runners
Olympic athletes of Great Britain
Athletes (track and field) at the 1992 Summer Olympics
Commonwealth Games bronze medallists for England
Commonwealth Games medallists in athletics
Athletes (track and field) at the 1990 Commonwealth Games
Athletes (track and field) at the 1994 Commonwealth Games
World Athletics Championships athletes for Great Britain
Medallists at the 1990 Commonwealth Games